Papa Malick Diop (born 25 October 1944 – 24 June 2013) was a Senegalese basketball player. He competed in the men's tournament at the 1968 Summer Olympics and the 1972 Summer Olympics.

References

External links
 

1944 births
2013 deaths
Senegalese men's basketball players
Olympic basketball players of Senegal
Basketball players at the 1968 Summer Olympics
Basketball players at the 1972 Summer Olympics
Basketball players from Dakar